Asclepias eriocarpa is a species of milkweed known by the common names woollypod milkweed, Indian milkweed, and kotolo. It is a perennial herb that grows in many types of habitats.

Description
Asclepias eriocarpa is an erect perennial herb which is usually coated in a thick layer of white hairs. The leaves are lance-shaped to oval, rippled, and arranged oppositely in pairs or in whorls of 3 or 4. The inflorescence is a large umbel-like cluster of flowers. Each flower is white to cream and usually tinted with bright pink. It has a central array of rounded hoods and a corolla reflexed against the stalk. The fruit is a large, woolly follicle. Flowers bloom May to October.

Distribution and habitat
Asclepias eriocarpa is native to California and adjacent parts of Nevada and Baja California. It grows in many habitat types such as rocky hillsides, woods, deserts, and especially dry areas.

Uses
The plant was used as a source of fiber and medicine by several California Indian groups, including the Ohlone and Luiseño. The Concow tribe calls the plant bō'-kō (Konkow language).

Ecology
Asclepias eriocarpa is a specific monarch butterfly food and habitat plant.
It is one of the most poisonous milkweeds. Natural History July/August 2015 calls it the most poisonous, but most sources put it below A. lancifolia (now known as Asclepias perennis).

References

External links
Jepson Manual Treatment: Asclepias eriocarpa
Asclepias eriocarpa Photo gallery

eriocarpa
Butterfly food plants
Flora of Baja California
Flora of California
Flora of Nevada
Flora of the Cascade Range
Flora of the Sierra Nevada (United States)
Flora of the Sonoran Deserts
Flora of the California desert regions
Natural history of the California chaparral and woodlands
Natural history of the Central Valley (California)
Natural history of the Colorado Desert
Natural history of the Mojave Desert
Natural history of the Peninsular Ranges
Natural history of the Santa Monica Mountains
Natural history of the Transverse Ranges